"My Kinda Girl" is a song performed and co-written by Babyface, issued as the fourth and final single from his album Tender Lover. The song was also the fourth consecutive hit single from the album, peaking at #30 on the Billboard Hot 100 in 1990. Solar/Epic released 7 remixes of the recording with a remix of Whip Appeal in 1990, which was available CD single.

Personnel
 Babyface: lead and background vocals, songwriter, producer, arranger, keyboards
 L.A. Reid: songwriter, producer, arranger, drums, percussion
 Daryl Simmons: songwriter, percussion
 Kayo: Moog bass
 Donald Parks: Fairlight synthesizer programming

Chart positions

Weekly charts

Year-end charts

References

1989 songs
1990 singles
Babyface (musician) songs
Epic Records singles
SOLAR Records singles
Song recordings produced by Babyface (musician)
Song recordings produced by L.A. Reid
Songs written by Babyface (musician)
Songs written by L.A. Reid
Songs written by Daryl Simmons